Plaza Romania is a shopping mall in Bucharest, Romania. The construction, based on an uncompleted hunger circus abandoned after the fall of Nicolae Ceaușescu, has three distinguishable parts — a central structure with a dome  in diameter, and two new and complex wing structures.  The centre has two functional sections — a mall and a hypermarket — which can be operated independently, according to operation conditions.  The site also includes an open-air carpark and an indoor carpark.  

The entire structure has four floors: the basement, which contains the carpark and leisure areas; the ground floor, which contains department stores, the Hypermarket, and retail stores; the first floor, which contains retail stores, leisure areas, and cinemas; and the second floor, which contains more retail shops and cinemas, as well as a bowling alley, a fitness centre and a food court. 

On August 29, 2009, a tribute to Michael Jackson was given at Plaza Romania with many dancers. This would have been his 51st birthday.

References

External links
Official website 

Shopping malls in Bucharest